Primo amore, internationally released as First Love, is a 1978 Italian comedy-drama film directed by Dino Risi. For her performance Ornella Muti won a Grolla d'oro for Best Actress.

Plot  
At a retirement home for entertainers, a former variety artist named Picchio arrives and finds many old friends. He also finds a beautiful young servant named Renata, who responds to his sympathetic approaches. When he receives a large cheque, she agrees to run away with him to Rome, where he promises to launch her into show business.

He takes her to the bridal suite of a luxurious hotel and in the morning goes with her to an agent, who explains that the  world of live variety is dead. She spends the next night in a disco with a young man who picked her up in the hotel. With Picchio unable to find work, they move to a cheap hotel used by prostitutes and the two go to lunch with Picchio's son, an inarticulate would-be painter living with a woman who openly despises him.

Looking for a job, Picchio takes Renata to a TV station where an old colleague works. The man says he can do nothing for Picchio and takes Renata away for an interview. When she does not return, Picchio goes in search and finds the pair having sex in a wardrobe room. Dragging her out and beating her in the street, he is hit in return by a bystander and collapses unconscious. After some time in hospital, he is released with partial amnesia. Outside the TV studios he sees Renata, who is now working there, and she slips him some money. All hope of love and fame gone, he takes a train back to the retirement home.

Cast 
 Ugo Tognazzi: Ugo Cremonesi aka Picchio
 Ornella Muti: Renata Mazzetti
 Riccardo Billi: Augustarello
Mario Del Monaco: director
Caterina Boratto: Lucy
Venantino Venantini:  Emilio
Enzo Maggio: Trottolino
Marina Hedman: the Polish wife
Vittorio Zarfati

See also 
 List of Italian films of 1978

References

External links

1978 films
Films directed by Dino Risi
Films set in Rome
Commedia all'italiana
Films scored by Riz Ortolani
Films with screenplays by Ruggero Maccari
Italian comedy-drama films
1978 comedy-drama films
1970s Italian films